Afrogyrorbis is a genus of gastropods in the family Planorbidae.

Species
Afrogyrorbis bicarinatus (Mandahl-Barth, 1954)
Afrogyrorbis blanfordi (Brown, 1973)
Afrogyrorbis kigeziensis (Preston, 1912)
Afrogyrorbis kisumiensis (Preston, 1912)
Afrogyrorbis natalensis (Krauss, 1848)
Afrogyrorbis subtilis (Mandahl-Barth, 1954)

References

Planorbidae
Gastropod genera